Moshoeshoe I International Airport  is an airport serving Maseru, the capital city of Lesotho. The airport is named in honor of Moshoeshoe I, king of Lesotho from 1822 to 1870.

Facilities

Airlines and destinations

See also
Transport in Lesotho
List of airports in Lesotho

References

External links
 Moshoeshoe I International Airport at Lesotho Department of Civil Aviation 
 
 

Airports in Lesotho
Buildings and structures in Maseru